Fiona Margaret Alpass is a New Zealand academic at Massey University.

Academic career
After a 1994 PhD titled  'The effects of organisational change in the military: a comparison of work related perceptions and experiences in military and non-military environments '  at Massey University, Alpass started working at Massey and rose to full professor in 2013.

Alpass has had a number of externally funded research projects, and a longitudinal aging studying run jointly with Christine Stephens, also at Massey.

Selected works
 Alpass, Fiona M., and Stephen Neville. "Loneliness, health and depression in older males." Aging & mental health 7, no. 3 (2003): 212–216.
 Stephens, Christine, Fiona Alpass, Andy Towers, and Brendan Stevenson. "The effects of types of social networks, perceived social support, and loneliness on the health of older people: Accounting for the social context." Journal of aging and health 23, no. 6 (2011): 887–911.
 Noone, Jack H., Christine Stephens, and Fiona M. Alpass. "Preretirement planning and well-being in later life: A prospective study." Research on Aging 31, no. 3 (2009): 295–317.
 Noone, Jack, Fiona Alpass, and Christine Stephens. "Do men and women differ in their retirement planning? Testing a theoretical model of gendered pathways to retirement preparation." Research on Aging 32, no. 6 (2010): 715–738.
 Alpass, Fiona, Andy Towers, Christine Stephens, Eljon Fitzgerald, Brendan Stevenson, and Judith Davey. "Independence, Well‐being, and Social Participation in an Aging Population." Annals of the New York Academy of Sciences 1114, no. 1 (2007): 241–250.

References

External links
 
 
 institutional homepage

Living people
Year of birth missing (living people)
Academic staff of the Massey University
New Zealand women academics
21st-century New Zealand women writers